Bucklick Creek (also called Brush Lick Creek) is a stream in northwest Franklin County in the U.S. state of Missouri. It is a tributary of Boeuf Creek.

The stream headwaters arise at  approximately two miles southeast of Kiel and just north of Missouri Route YY. The stream flows north for approximately five miles and passes under Missouri Route KK to its confluence with Boeuf Creek two miles southeast of New Haven.

Bucklick Creek was named for a mineral lick where male deer (bucks) were observed.

See also
List of rivers of Missouri

References

Rivers of Franklin County, Missouri
Rivers of Missouri